Mammoths, Sabertooths, and Hominids: 65 Million Years of Mammalian Evolution in Europe is a book written by Jordi Agustí and illustrated by Mauricio Antón. It was first published in 2002 by Columbia University Press.

The book is a journey through  of palaeontological records, from the extinction of the dinosaurs to just before present.  Notwithstanding the title, the book includes the complex evolutionary records of most continents within its pages – thoroughfully described by Agustí and breathtakingly illustrated by Antón.

Agustí and Antón provide a broad overview of the Tertiary history of mammals in Europe: the evolutionary changes within the European fauna as well as the fates of immigrant taxa that arrived from other continents.

References

See also 
 National Geographic Prehistoric Mammals
 BBC's Walking with Beasts

2002 non-fiction books
2002 in paleontology
American non-fiction books
Paleontology books
Books about cats
Books about elephants